AnandTech is an online computer hardware magazine owned by Future plc. It was founded in 1997 by then-14-year-old Anand Lal Shimpi, who served as CEO and editor-in-chief until August 30, 2014, with Ryan Smith replacing him as editor-in-chief. The web site is a source of hardware reviews for off-the-shelf components and exhaustive benchmarking, targeted towards computer building enthusiasts, but later expanded to cover mobile devices such as smartphones and tablets. Its investigative articles have been cited by other technology news sites like PC Magazine and The Inquirer.

Some of their articles on mass-market products such as mobile phones are syndicated by CNNMoney. The large accompanying forum is recommended by some books for bargain hunting in the technology field. AnandTech was acquired by Purch on 17 December 2014. Purch was acquired by Future in 2018.

History 
In its early stages, Matthew Witheiler served as co-owner and Senior Hardware Editor, creating insightful and in-depth reviews for the site. In 2004 AnandTech added a feature to search for computer prices via a price engine developed in house by the senior editor as a graduate project in data mining. This price engine is called RTPE.

In 2006, an AnandTech editor launched a spin-off called DailyTech, a technology news site. The move followed a similar evolution of the news section of AnandTech's peer publication, Tom's Guide, into TG Daily some months earlier.

On August 30, 2014, Anand announced his decision to retire from the technology publishing industry to work at Apple, and named longtime AnandTech editor Ryan Smith as his successor.

On December 17, 2014, Purch announced the acquisition of Anandtech.com.

In 2018, Anandtech and other Purch consumer brands were sold to Future.

The editorial team has also included Senior Editor, Dr. Ian Cutress (who departed in February 2022), as well as Motherboard expert Gavin Bonshor.

Reviews
Describing AnandTech in 2008, author Paul McFedries wrote that "its heart and its claim to fame is the massive collection of incredibly in-depth reviews".
In 2008, blogging expert Bruce C. Brown called AnandTech one of the "big dogs in the tech field".
In 2005, computer expert Leo Laporte described AnandTech as an "outstanding review and technology website for 3D hardware and other computer components", and said that it is "one of the most professional hardware review sites online".

Forums 
AnandTech has over 350,000 registered users and over 35 million posts. The AnandTech forums are home to distributive computing teams known collectively as TeAm AnandTech (or simply The TeAm). AnandTech contains a wide variety of sub-forums, including the casual environment of AnandTech Off-Topic (or ATOT as the members call it) to the far more technical Highly Technical forum. AnandTech also maintains several highly regulated e-commerce forums, such as Hot Deals and For Sale/For Trade.

In July 2007, the forum underwent major changes that site administrators stated as necessary for furthering userbase growth. The profanity filter was removed (although use of vulgar language is limited), and the identities of traditionally anonymous volunteer moderators were revealed (with the exception of two). Many sub-forums were restructured and added in this overhaul as well.

See also 
 CNET
 Maximum PC
 TechCrunch
 The Tech Report
 Tom's Hardware
 ZDNet
 List of Internet forums

References

External links 
 

Computing websites
Magazines established in 1997
American technology news websites
Computer magazines published in the United States
Online computer magazines